Ghandruk is a Village Development Committee in the Kaski District of the Gandaki Province of Nepal. Situated at a distance of 32 km north-west to Pokhara, the village is readily accessible by public buses and private taxis from the provincial headquarter. At the time of the 1991 Nepal census, it had a population of 4,748 residing in 1,013 individual households.

Ghandruk is a common place for treks in the Annapurna range of Nepal (Annapurna Base camp and Annapurna Circuit treks, in particular). The peaks of Mt Annapurna, Mt Machapuchare, Gangapurna and Mt Hiunchuli can be seen from the village, and it is also the gateway to the Poon hill. Gurung communities comprise the major inhabitants of the village. The village is home to Shree Meshrom Baraha Secondary School, a government school which provides education to children aged 5-18. Local attractions include the Gurung Cultural Museum and Meshram Baraha temple.

References

External links

UN map of the municipalities of Kaski District
Nepal Village

Populated places in Kaski District